Himbasha or Ambasha, is a Eritrean celebration bread that is slightly sweet. It became popular in Eritrean cuisine, often served at special occasions. It is prepared in a number of varieties depending on region and nationality with the main two being the quintessential Ethiopian variant, and the more distinctive Eritrean flavoring with raisins.

The dough is given a decorative touch before baking. The design varies in detail, but in general, is given the shape of a wheel with indentations to create several spokes (see picture).

Common additions to the recipe include candied orange, ginger, or ground cardamom seeds, although plain varieties are not unheard of.

See also
 Ethiopian cuisine
 List of African dishes

References

Ethiopian cuisine
Sweet breads
Yeast breads